Municipal Mazdoor Union, a trade union of municipal workers in Mumbai. MMU is affiliated to the Hind Mazdoor Kisan Panchayat. MMU was established in December 1955 by Placid D’Mello and George Fernandes.

References 

Trade unions in India
Hind Mazdoor Kisan Panchayat-affiliated unions